The Abrud is a small river in the Apuseni Mountains, Alba County, western Romania. It is a right tributary of the river Arieș. It flows through the town Abrud, and joins the Arieș in Vârși, near Câmpeni. It is fed by several smaller streams, including Valea Buciumanilor, Valea Cerbului, Corna, Cernița and Roșia Montană.

References

Rivers of Romania
Rivers of Alba County